Fernando Lewis (born 31 January 1993) is a footballer who plays as a right back for Quick Boys. Born in the Netherlands, he represents the Aruba national football team. He formerly played for AZ, Go Ahead Eagles and FC Dordrecht.

Career
On 19 August 2020, Lewis joined Tweede Divisie side Quick Boys on a free transfer, signing a one-year deal.

International
Lewis made his Aruba national football team debut on 2 June 2021 in the 2022 FIFA World Cup qualification game against Cayman Islands.

References

External links
 

Living people
1993 births
Footballers from The Hague
Association football wingers
Aruban footballers
Aruba international footballers
Dutch footballers
Netherlands youth international footballers
Dutch people of Aruban descent
Dutch sportspeople of Surinamese descent
AZ Alkmaar players
Jong AZ players
Go Ahead Eagles players
FC Dordrecht players
Willem II (football club) players
Eredivisie players